Iskender Pasha (died 1571) was an Ottoman statesman. He was the governor of Egypt for the Ottoman Empire from 1556 to 1559. During his term as governor (beylerbey), he had many works of architecture built in Cairo, especially between Bab Zuweila and Bab al-Khalq. However, the area was mostly renovated in the 19th century during modernization attempts.

See also
 List of Ottoman governors of Egypt

References

 

Ottoman governors of Egypt
16th-century Ottoman governors of Egypt
Pashas
1571 deaths